Edgar Lawrence Kaw (January 18, 1897 – December 13, 1971) was an American football player. He attended Cornell University, where he was a prominent halfback on coach Gil Dobie's Cornell Big Red football team, graduating in 1923.  He was a shifty open-field runner known as one of the sport's greatest. His stride had one foot farther than the other. Kaw scored 90 points in 1921. That year, Cornell beat Penn 41–0 in the mud, and Kaw scored five touchdowns. Kaw "skipped over the ooze and water as if he were running on a cinder track, sidestepping a small lake and a Penn tackler with one and the same motion." He was elected into the Sphinx Head Society during his senior year. Kaw played 11 games for the Buffalo Bisons in 1924.

In 1956, Kaw, then a resident of Oakland, California, was inducted into the College Football Hall of Fame. He was flown to New York and inducted into the Hall of Fame during a halftime ceremony at the Cornell–Harvard game in October 1956. He died in Walnut Creek, California in 1971.

References

External links
 
 

1897 births
1971 deaths
American football halfbacks
Buffalo Bisons (NFL) players
Cornell Big Red football players
St. Lawrence Saints baseball coaches
St. Lawrence Saints football coaches
St. Lawrence Saints men's basketball coaches
All-American college football players
College Football Hall of Fame inductees
Sportspeople from Houston
Sports coaches from Minneapolis
Coaches of American football from Minnesota
Players of American football from Minneapolis
Players of American football from Houston
Baseball coaches from Minnesota
Basketball coaches from Minnesota
Baseball coaches from Texas
Basketball coaches from Texas